Éric Moulines (born in Bordeaux on 24 January 1963) is a French researcher in statistical learning and signal processing.  He received the silver medal from the CNRS in 2010, the France Télécom prize awarded in collaboration with the French Academy of Sciences in 2011. He was appointed a Fellow of the European Association for Signal Processing in 2012 and of the Institute of Mathematical Statistics in 2016. He is General Engineer of the Corps des Mines (X81).

Biography 
Éric Moulines entered the École polytechnique in 1981, then went to study at Télécom ParisTech.

He began his career at the Centre national d'études des télécommunications where he worked on speech synthesis from text. He is involved in the development of new waveform synthesis methods called PSOLA (pitch synchronous overlap and add).

After defending his thesis in 1990, he joined the École Nationale Supérieure des Télécommunications as a lecturer. He then became interested in different problems of statistical signal processing. In particular, it contributes to the development of subspaces methods for the identification of multivariate linear systems and source separation and develops new algorithms for adaptive system estimation.

He received the authorization to direct research in 2006 and became a professor at Télécom Paris. He then devoted himself mainly to the application of Bayesian methods with applications in signal processing and statistics.

Éric Moulines directed 21 theses, was president of the jury for 9 theses, was rapporteur for 10 theses, was member of the jury for 6 theses.

Scientific work 
He is interested in the inference of latent variable models and in particular hidden Markov chains, and non-linear state models (non-linear filtering) In particular, it contributes to filtering methods using interacting particle systems. He was more generally interested in the inference of partially observed Markovian models, coupling estimation and simulation problems with Monte Carlo Markov Chain Methods (MCMC). He has also developed numerous theoretical tools for the convergence analysis of MCMC algorithms, obtaining fundamental results on the long time behaviour of Markov chains.

Since 2005, he has been working on statistical learning problems, including the analysis of stochastic optimization algorithms.

He joined the Centre de mathématiques appliquées de l'École polytechnique as a professor in 2015. He is interested in Bayesian inference from large scale models, with applications in uncertainty quantification in statistical learning.

Honours and awards 

 Elected member of the French Academy of Sciences in 2017
 CNRS Silver Medal in 2010
 Officier of the Palmes Académiques.

References

1963 births
Scientists from Bordeaux
Members of the French Academy of Sciences
École Polytechnique alumni
Academic staff of École Polytechnique
French National Centre for Scientific Research awards
French mathematicians
French statisticians
Living people